Anthony Hussein Hinde (1953 – 27 May 2008) was an Australian-born Maldivian surfer and surfing pioneer. Hinde is considered to be the "father of surfing in the Maldives." He is co-credited with discovering the surfing potential in the Maldives, along with Australian surfer Mark Scanlon, and kick-starting the nation's emerging tourism industry.

Hinde's life in the Maldives began in December 1973. Hinde and fellow Australian surfer Mark Scanlon were shipwrecked on the North Malé atoll in the Maldives aboard the Whitewings, a ketch in which they had been hired as crewmembers. The Whitewings had been en route across the Indian Ocean from Sri Lanka to Réunion Island when they ran aground. Hinde spent several unplanned months in the Maldives repairing the boat. However, he quickly discovered how good the surfing potential was in the northern Maldives and decided to stay in the country.

In order to stay in the country Hinde became a Maldivian citizen and converted to Islam, adding Hussein to his name. He married a Maldivian woman, Zulfa, on 27 May 1983. Hinde largely managed to keep the surfing possibilities of the Maldives an open secret among surfing friends for almost fifteen years. However, in the mid-1980s Hinde opened Atoll Adventures, a surfing camp in Tari village, in response to plans by foreign investor to open resorts in the area. Hinde continued to run the surfing camp and hotel, which changes its name to Dhonveli Beach & Spa in early 2000. It is now known as Chaaya Dhonveli, or Dhonveli Beach.

Tony Hussein Hinde died on 27 May 2008 while surfing at Pasta Point in Malé Atoll in the Maldives at the age of 55. He suffered an apparent heart attack after riding a wave. He was found floating face down in the water, but CPR failed to resuscitate him. He was buried at Mollymook cemetery in his native New South Wales, Australia on 3 June 2008. Local Maldivian and foreign surfers held a memorial at Varunulaa Raalhugandu, the main surfing spot in the capital city of Malé, and at Pasta Point on 8 June.

Hinde was survived by his daughter, Mishal, and his son, Ashley. His wife, Zulfa, whom he married in 1983, died in January 2008. The same day that Hinde died would have marked the couple's twenty-fifth wedding anniversary.

The Dhivehi Observer, a Maldivian newspaper based in the United Kingdom, said of Hinde that "In fact most Maldivians think he is a Maldivian but is an Australian who has bridged that cultural gap" (between the two countries).

References

External links
The Daily Telegraph: Tony Hussain Hinde, surfer who 'found' Maldives, dies
Tony 'Hussein' Hinde Dies In Maldives While Surfing 

1953 births
2008 deaths
Australian emigrants to the Maldives
Australian surfers
Converts to Islam
Maldivian Muslims
Maldivian surfers
Date of birth missing
Place of birth missing